Torodora wauensis is a moth in the family Lecithoceridae. It was described by Kyu-Tek Park in 2010. It is found in Papua New Guinea.

Torodora wauensis is superficially similar to Torodora meyi and Torodora namalis, but the forewings have a less distinct wedge-shaped streak at three-fourths of the costa and the fringe is dark rather than creamy white in the apical region.

References

Moths described in 2010
Torodora